Prospective parliamentary candidate (PPC), in British politics, is a candidate selected by political parties to fight individual Westminster constituencies in advance of a general election. The term originally came into use because of the strict limits on the amount of expenses incurred by an election candidate, regardless of whether the election had been formally called. The candidates were termed "prospective" because referring to them simply as a candidate would arguably trigger the moment when money spent to promote them would need to be included in their declaration of expenses after the election.

In 2004, however, the law was changed so that the trigger for election expenses being accountable was to be the calling of an election and not the announcing of a candidacy. Some political parties had already started to use terms such as "parliamentary spokesperson", believing that some voters were confused by the unusual word "prospective"; however, the older form of words continues to be widely used, despite these changes in the law.

References

See also 
 Presumptive nominee

Elections in the United Kingdom
Politics of the United Kingdom